The 1978–79 Yorkshire Football League was the 53rd season in the history of the Yorkshire Football League, a football competition in England.

Division One

Division One featured 12 clubs which competed in the previous season, along with four new clubs, promoted from Division Two:
Bentley Victoria Welfare
Kiveton Park
Ossett Town
Scarborough reserves

League table

Map

Division Two

Division Two featured eight clubs which competed in the previous season, along with eight new clubs.
Clubs relegated from Division One:
Denaby United
Farsley Celtic
Leeds & Carnegie Polytechnic
Ossett Albion
Clubs promoted from Division Three:
Rawmarsh Welfare
Thorne Colliery
Wombwell Sporting Association
Yorkshire Amateur

League table

Map

Division Three

Division Three featured eleven clubs which competed in the previous season, along with four new clubs.
Clubs relegated from Division Two:
Collingham
Harrogate Town
Pickering Town
Plus:
Garforth Miners, joined from the West Yorkshire League

League table

Map

League Cup

Final

References

1978–79 in English football leagues
Yorkshire Football League